The terrorist attack against cyclists in Tajikistan happened on July 29, 2018 (UTC+05:00). Four Western touring cyclists were killed while cycling in the Danghara District, and two more were injured after five Islamist militants rammed them with a car and then got out of the vehicle and stabbed them.

Background 
Terrorist movements are known to be present in Central Asia; Afghanistan, with which Tajikistan shares a long border, has been affected by decades of Islamist murderous attacks. However, terrorist attacks have been infrequent in Tajikistan, mostly targeting the Government agencies.

The country is popular with touring cyclists because of its scenic mountain roads like the Pamir highway.

Attack 
On July 29, 2018 at approximately 3:30 pm, while seven Western cyclists were cycling the Kulyab-Dushanbe highway (A385) next to the village of Safobakhsh on the Danghara district, about a 100 km south of Tajikistan's capital Dushanbe, 5 assailants driving a Daewoo sedan made a U-turn and rammed into them with their vehicle; then, they got out of the car and stabbed them with some knives and an ax. Four cyclists died and two were injured. According to Radio Free Europe, the men were searching for a target in order to perpetrate a terrorist attack and found the cyclists "by chance" on the highway; their backer agreed with the target on July 28 and they then followed them until the attack.

Victims 
Four touring cyclists died, Jay Austin and Lauren Geoghegan, from the US, who were on a world cycling tour, René Wokke, a Dutch citizen, and Markus Hummel from Switzerland. One Swiss and one Dutch were admitted in the hospital in critical condition while a Frenchman who had fallen behind the group before the attack remained unharmed.

Suspects 
According to the Tajik authorities, the perpetrators are five Tajik nationals. Hussein Abdusamadov, 33, who had recently come back to Tajikistan from Russia, was said to be the ringleader of the group. He was arrested early on July 30. The other four suspects were killed by the police while, according to the police, resisting their arrest. Zafarjon Safarov and Asomiddin Majidov, both 19-years-old, two relatives of Abdusamadov, had just come back from Russia two days before the attacks. The two others are Jafariddin Yusupov, 26, and Asliddin Yusupov, 21, two siblings. The oldest is said to have been radicalized by Abdusamadov in Russia and accordingly convinced his brother to join the plot. The younger brother had served as a soldier in the Tajik Army.

The group of five appear in a video posthumously released by news agencies of the Islamic State of Iraq and the Levant in which they pledge allegiance to its self-proclaimed caliph Abu Bakr al-Baghdadi. However, the Tajik authorities downplayed the IS responsibility, blaming instead the Islamic Renaissance Party of Tajikistan that was banned in 2015, the General prosecutor of Tajikistan consider that the IS allegiance is just a cover.

The backer of the attack appears to be a 45-year-old Tajik cleric named Nosirhoja Ubaidov and known as Qori Nosir who radicalized Hussein Abdusamadov and asked him to carry out a terrorist attack. Tajik authorities have linked him with the Islamic Renaissance Party of Tajikistan and Iran without presenting any specific evidence, both the IRPT and Iran have denied any links with the attack.

Tajikistan experts have put into question the Tajik government allegations, insisting that the attack was most likely perpetuated by grass-roots Islamic State sympathizers, explaining that accusing the Islamic Renaissance Party is an opportunity for the officials to repress opposition groups while downplaying the Islamic State regional threat.

On March 2, 2020 the ringleader Abdusamadov died while in prison. Tajik authorities stated that his body bore no signs of violence, and added that investigations had been launched into the death. On March 4, Abdusamadov's mother told RFE/RL that the given cause of death was kidney failure, while also expressing skepticism. She also confirmed that there were no apparent traces of violence on her son's body.

Aftermath 
A memorial plaque was erected in the village of Safobakhsh next to the attack site. Tajik authorities fear the murder will ruin efforts made recently to promote tourism in the country; many travel cancellations occurred after the events.

Some English-speaking news sites and social media posts raised the idea that the American couple had been excessively naive for travelling in Tajikistan. Before the attack, however, the official U.S. travel advisory for Tajikistan was at Level 1, the lowest; it was raised to Level 2 (exercise increased caution) in the aftermath of the attack.

References 

Terrorist attack against cyclists in Tajikistan
2018 in Tajikistan
Attacks on tourists in Asia
American people murdered abroad
Dutch people murdered abroad
Swiss people murdered abroad
Murders by motor vehicle
Islamic terrorist incidents in 2018
July 2018 crimes in Asia
Terrorist incidents involving vehicular attacks
Vehicular rampage in Asia
Bicycle tours
Cycling road incident deaths
Mass murder in 2018
Terrorist incidents in Asia in 2018
Tajikistan–United States relations
Khatlon Region
Murder in Tajikistan
2018 murders in Asia
ISIL terrorist incidents in Asia